Demolición (in English: "Demolition") is a song by the Peruvian rock band Los Saicos. It was the second promotional single and quickly became a success in their country.

Promotion
Released as a single, "Demolition" became one of the most popular songs of Peruvian rock at the time, and it remains so still. The song is an anthem of the group and is among the most beloved in all of Peru. The song is based on a very catchy melody, with disorder and a rhythm very typical of punk music.

Style and composition 
The song was composed by the band's vocalist, Erwin Flores, during a rehearsal in 1964. It begins with the hummed cries of Flores: "ta-ta-ta-ta-ta-ta-ta-ta-ya-ya-ya" and its lyrics are anarchic: "Echemos abajo la estación de tren / Echemos abajo la estación de tren / Demoler, Demoler, Demoler / Demoler, demoler la estación de tren" (Let's destroy the train station / Let's destroy the train station / Demolish, demolish, demolish / Demolish, demolish the train station). In spite of the period Peru was going through, the lyrics lack any political content. Its lyrics imply that train stations must be deliberately demolished and destroyed as an act of complete rebellion.

The melody is repetitive and composed of four stanzas. Its harmonic structure comprises three simple major chords: A, D, and E.

The instrumentation is influenced by the surf rock of Dick Dale (which was very popular at the time) and its duration is only 2:53.

In 1965, the song was recorded by the label Dis-Perú in Peru and was published the same year. It was re-released by Electro-Harmonix some years later.

Legacy 
This song was used in a British commercial for a brand of cat food, called Temptations.

See also 
Latino punk
Garage rock
Latin rock

References

External links 
 

1965 songs
1965 singles
Punk rock songs
Protopunk songs